D'Andre Tiyon Swift (born January 14, 1999) is an American football running back for the Detroit Lions of the National Football League (NFL). He played college football at Georgia and was drafted by the Lions with the third pick of the second round of the 2020 NFL Draft.

Early years
Swift attended St. Joseph's Preparatory School in Philadelphia, Pennsylvania. As a senior, he played high school football and rushed for 1,564 yards on 149 carries with 25 touchdowns. He committed to the University of Georgia to play college football.

College career
As a freshman at Georgia in 2017, Swift was the third running back behind future NFL starters Nick Chubb and Sony Michel. On 73 carries, he rushed for 597 yards with three touchdowns.

His sophomore year, Swift split carries fairly evenly with junior Elijah Holyfield, though he was used more often as a receiver. He had three consecutive games with over 100 yards rushing in games against Florida, Kentucky, and Auburn that season. In the SEC Championship against Alabama, he had 16 carries for 75 rushing yards and a rushing touchdown to go along with six receptions for 63 receiving yards and a receiving touchdown in the 35–28 loss.

As a junior, Swift recorded five games with over 100 rushing yards and had a stretch of four consecutive games with a rushing touchdown. He totaled 196 carries for 1,218 rushing yards and seven rushing touchdowns to go along with 24 receptions for 216 receiving yards and one receiving touchdown in 14 games.

College statistics

Professional career

Detroit Lions
Swift was selected by the Detroit Lions with the 35th overall pick in the second round of the 2020 NFL Draft. On July 13, 2020, the Lions signed Swift to a four-year contract, worth $8.5 million.

2020 season
In his rookie season, Swift shared the backfield with Adrian Peterson and Kerryon Johnson. In Swift's professional debut on September 13, 2020, he recorded his first career rushing touchdown, but later dropped what would have been a game-winning touchdown pass in the final seconds against the Chicago Bears. On October 18, in Week 6, Swift rushed for 116 yards and two touchdowns against the Jacksonville Jaguars, becoming the first Lions rookie running back to rush for 100-plus yards and score two touchdowns in a game since Barry Sanders in 1989. In Week 10, against the Washington Football Team, he had 149 scrimmage yards and a receiving touchdown in the 30–27 victory. In Week 15 against the Tennessee Titans. Overall, Swift finished the 2020 season with 114 carries for 521 rushing yards and eight rushing touchdowns to go along with 46 receptions for 357 receiving yards and two receiving touchdowns in 13 games.

2021 season

Swift was joined by Jamaal Williams in the Lions' backfield for the 2021 season. Over the season's first eight games, Swift totaled over 100 yards from scrimmage in four of them. In Weeks 10 and 11, Swift recorded 130 and 136 rushing yards against the Pittsburgh Steelers and Cleveland Browns.

NFL career statistics

References

External links
Detroit Lions bio
Georgia Bulldogs bio

1999 births
Living people
Players of American football from Philadelphia
American football running backs
Georgia Bulldogs football players
Detroit Lions players